Wandan Township is a rural township in Pingtung County, Taiwan.

Names
Dutch records used the placenames Tamsuy and Tampsui to refer to Tamsui in the north of the island, but have also referred to this area in the south as "Tamsuy". In the early 20th century, maps showed two Tamsuy rivers, one north and one south; the Chinese would distinguish the two places by calling the north place Teng Tamsuy (upper Tamsui) and the south place E Tamsuy (lower Tamsui).

Geography

Administrative divisions

The township comprises 30 villages: Baocuo, Gantang, Guangan, Houcun, Jiaxing, Lunding, Shangcun, Shekou, Shepi, Sheshang, Shezhong, Shuiquan, Shuixian, Siwei, Tiancuo, Wanan, Wanhou, Wanhui, Wannei, Wanquan, Wansheng, Xiabei, Xianan, Xiangshe, Xingan, Xingquan, Xinzhong, Xinzhuang, Zhuanliao and Zhulin.

Economy
Brick manufacturing once flourished in the area due to the availability of clay and natural gas.

Transportation
 Provincial Highway No. 27:Pingtung City － Wandan Township － Xinyuan Township
 Provincial Highway No. 88
 County Highway No. 189:Pingtung City － Wandan Township － Chaozhou Township

Notable natives
 Chang Feng-hsu, Magistrate of Pingtung County (1964-1973)
 Wu Jin-lin, President of the Examination Yuan (2014–2020)

References

External links

 Wandan Township Office, Pingtung County Government 
 

Townships in Pingtung County